Arabesque for Atoms is a 1965 Australian television play shot in Brisbane.

Plot
An English atomic scientist (Alister Smart) on his way to a Pacific testing site takes refuge in a lonely house in Brisbane. He is visited by a seductress called Stella (Margery Milne).

Cast
Alister Smart
Margery Milne
Phillip College
Linda Chan

Production
Alister Smart and Margery Milne were married in real life. It was shot at ABC's studios in Toowong with externals filmed in city streets and at Eagle Farm Airport.

The script was also performed on radio.

See also
Vacancy in Vaughan Street (1963)
Dark Brown (1963)
The Quiet Season (1965)
Ring Out Wild Bells (1964)
The Absence of Mr Sugden (1965)
A Sleep of Prisoners (1961)
The Monkey Cage (1966)

References

1965 television plays
1960s Australian television plays